Noel Gilroy Annan, Baron Annan OBE (25 December 1916 – 21 February 2000) was a British military intelligence officer, author, and academic. During his military career, he rose to the rank of colonel and was appointed to the Order of the British Empire as an Officer (OBE). He was provost of King's College, Cambridge, 1956–66, provost of University College London, 1966–78, vice-chancellor of the University of London, and a member of the House of Lords.

Annan's publications include Leslie Stephen (1951)—awarded the James Tait Black Memorial Prize, Roxburgh of Stowe (1965), Our Age (1990), described by Professor John Gray in the New Statesman as a "marvellous compendium of the higher gossip", Changing Enemies (1995), and The Dons (1999). His best-known essay is "The Intellectual Aristocracy", which illustrates, according to Robert Fulford in the National Post, the "web of kinship that united British intellectuals (the Darwins, Huxleys, Macaulays, etc.) in the 19th and early 20th centuries."

Early life and education
Annan was born in Gloucester Terrace, London, and was educated at St. Winnifred's School, Seaford in East Sussex, and Stowe School. At Stowe, he was head of Temple House, and editor of the school newspaper The Stoic. He went up to King's College, Cambridge, in 1935, where he read History, then continued for a fourth year to read Law. While at King's, he was recruited into the Cambridge Apostles, a secret debating society whose members included Guy Burgess and Michael Straight, who later became spies for the Soviet Union (see Cambridge Five).

Military career
In October 1940, he entered officer cadet training, and in January 1941 was commissioned in the Intelligence Corps and posted to MI14, a department of the War Office, where "Annan was given an important job in operational intelligence studying the movement by rail of German forces." In 1942, he was posted to the Joint Intelligence Staff in the War Cabinet Office, which was located with Winston Churchill in his bunker. Annan was appointed an Officer of the Order of the British Empire (OBE) in 1946.

Academic career
Annan returned to King's in 1946, where he had been elected to a fellowship in absentia in 1944 at the unusually young age of 28. He joined the economics faculty and lectured in politics.

In June 1950, he married the author and critic Gabriele Ullstein, and they had two daughters – Lucy (born 1952) and Juliet (born 1955).

He was elected Provost of King's in 1956. In 1966, he took up the post of Provost of University College London, then from 1978 until 1981, was Vice-Chancellor of the University of London – the first person to take on the role full-time. He was created a life peer on 16 July 1965 as Baron Annan, of the Royal Burgh of Annan in the County of Dumfries. 

He was elected a Foreign Honorary Member of the American Academy of Arts and Sciences in 1974. Essex University awarded him an honorary doctorate in 1967. He was also a Fellow of the Royal Historical Society.

Committees
He acted as a trustee of the British Museum 1963–1980, and of the National Gallery 1978–85. He also chaired the Royal Commission on Broadcasting, which concluded in 1977 (see Annan Committee). He was the first chairman of the Trustee's education committee at Churchill College, Cambridge.

Bibliography

Annan was a signatory to a famous letter published in The Times in 1958 which precipitated the establishment of the Homosexual Law Reform Society, which campaigned for homosexual law reform. (See Patrick Higgins, Heterosexual Dictatorship: Male Homosexuality in Post-War Britain, London: Fourth Estate Ltd; 1996, p. 125.)

See also
 List of Vice-Chancellors of the University of London

References

Further reading
Lord Noel Gilroy Annan, memorial booklet published by King's College, Cambridge, 2001.
Portraits of Annan, National Portrait Gallery
The Papers of Noel Gilroy Annan, Janus, Cambridge
"Oxford and Cambridge dons", National Post, 2 May 2005
Baron Annan, Senate House Library archives, University of London
"A reputation of merit – Michael Young: Social Entrepreneur" by John Gray, New Statesman, 15 October 2001
Appearance on Desert Island Discs - 4 November 1990

1916 births
2000 deaths
Writers from London
People educated at Stowe School
Crossbench life peers
Alumni of King's College, Cambridge
Fellows of King's College, Cambridge
Provosts of King's College, Cambridge
Academics of University College London
Academics of the University of London
People associated with the National Gallery, London
Trustees of the British Museum
Fellows of the American Academy of Arts and Sciences
Fellows of the Royal Historical Society
Vice-Chancellors of the University of London
Officers of the Order of the British Empire
James Tait Black Memorial Prize recipients
Provosts of University College London
People associated with the University of East Anglia
20th-century British historians
British Army personnel of World War II
Intelligence Corps officers
Life peers created by Elizabeth II